Julia Marian Jones (27 March 1923 – 9 October 2015) was a British television scriptwriter and former actress.

Jones began her career as a television writer in 1965. Her works include the adaptation of  Quiet as a Nun (1978) for the Armchair Thriller series; the BBC's Miss Marple series; the pilot episode of ITV's Wycliffe (1993); a serial dramatisation of the novel, Anne of Green Gables (with Donald Churchill, 1972); the comedy-drama, Moody and Pegg (also with Donald Churchill, 1974-75); Our Mutual Friend (1976); and Tom's Midnight Garden (1989).

References

External links
 

1923 births
2015 deaths
English dramatists and playwrights
English television writers
British women television writers